Secondo Caldarelli (13 August 1923 – 15 August 1978) was a Luxembourgian footballer. He played in eleven matches for the Luxembourg national football team from 1954 to 1955. He was also part of Luxembourg's team for their qualification matches for the 1954 FIFA World Cup.

References

External links
 

1923 births
1978 deaths
Luxembourgian footballers
Luxembourg international footballers
Place of birth missing
Association football defenders
FC Progrès Niederkorn players